Frank Carter (27 July 1910 – 17 July 1988) was an Irish Fianna Fáil politician. A shopkeeper, he was elected to Dáil Éireann as a Fianna Fáil Teachta Dála (TD) for the Longford–Westmeath constituency at the 1951 general election. He was re-elected at the 1954 general election but lost his seat at the 1957 general election. He was subsequently elected to the 9th Seanad on the Labour Panel. He was re-elected to the Dáil at the 1961 general election. He was re-elected at each subsequent general election until he retired from politics at the 1977 general election.

References

1910 births
1988 deaths
Fianna Fáil TDs
Members of the 14th Dáil
Members of the 15th Dáil
Members of the 9th Seanad
Members of the 17th Dáil
Members of the 18th Dáil
Members of the 19th Dáil
Members of the 20th Dáil
Fianna Fáil senators